Fındıklı (Turkish for "with hazelnuts" or "place with hazelnuts") may refer to:

 Fındıklı, Amasya, a village in Amasya Province, Turkey
 Fındıklı, Beyoğlu, a neighborhood in the Beyoğlu district of Istanbul, Turkey
 Fındıklı, Borçka, a village in Artvin Province, Turkey
 Fındıklı, Gelibolu
 Fındıklı, Gönen, a village
 Fındıklı, Kaynaşlı
 Fındıklı, Mecitözü
 Fındıklı, Ortaköy
 Fındıklı, Pozantı, a village in Adana Province, Turkey
 Fındıklı, Rize, a town and district of Rize Province, Turkey
 Fındıklı, Tercan
 Fındıklıçalı, Kahta, a village in Adıyaman Province, Turkey